Opteni is a rural locality (a village) in Klimovsky District, Bryansk Oblast, Russia. The population was 15 as of 2010. There is 1 street.

Geography 
Opteni is located 21 km south of Klimovo (the district's administrative centre) by road.

References 

Rural localities in Klimovsky District